Osmund (Latin Osmundus) is a Germanic name composed of the word Os meaning "god" and mund meaning "protection." 

Osmund or Osmond may refer to:

Pre-modern era
Ordered chronologically
 Osmund of Sussex, a king of Sussex
 Osmund (bishop of London), (died c. 808)
 Osmond Drengot (c. 985–1018), Norman adventurer who fought with and against the Byzantines
 Osmund (missionary bishop), first Swedish bishop
 Saint Osmund (died 1099), Norman count, bishop of Salisbury and Catholic and Anglican saint

Modern era
Ordered alphabetically
 Osmond Ardagh (1900–1954), English cricketer
 Osmond Barnes (1834–1930), British colonel in the Indian Army
 Osmond Borradaile (1898–1999), Canadian cameraman and cinematographer
 Osmond Brock (1869–1947), British Royal Navy admiral of the fleet and commander-in-chief of the Mediterranean Fleet
 Osmund de Silva (1901–1980), Inspector-General of Sri Lanka Police from 1955 to 1959
 Sir Osmond Esmonde, 12th Baronet (1896–1936), Irish politician
 Osmond Ezinwa (born 1971), Nigerian sprinter
 Osmond Fisher (1817–1914), English geologist and geophysicist
 Osmond Ingram (1887–1917), United States Navy sailor and posthumous recipient of the Medal of Honor
 Osmond Kendall, developer in 1953 of the Composer-Tron for the Canadian Marconi Company
 Osmund Jayaratne (1924–2006), Sri Lankan politician and academic
 Sir Osmond Williams, 1st Baronet (1849–1927), Welsh politician
 Osmond Wright ), Jamaican-born and London-based singer, songwriter, and producer, stage name Mozez

See also
Åsmund (disambiguation)
Osmond (disambiguation)

Masculine given names